The Chilton Club is a private social club established in 1910, in the Back Bay area of Boston, Massachusetts. Founded by Pauline Revere Thayer, the club was intended in part as a counterpoint to the Mayflower Club. The club was named after Mary Chilton because she had been the first woman to step out of the Mayflower.

The club occupies a large red brick building on Commonwealth Avenue, designed in 1870 by architect "Henry Richards of the firm of Ware and Van Brunt." (However, some claim the building was designed by architects Peabody and Stearns.) The building has been altered and expanded over the years."On May 18, 1910, the Chilton Club applied for (and subsequently received) permission to significantly remodel and expand the house, including removing the original third floor, with its mansard roof, and adding three additional floors, two of brick and the third "in roof."  They also received permission to construct an addition at the rear, 38 feet by 18 feet 9 inches, five stories high above the basement, four of brick and one "in roof."  The Club retained the firm of Richardson, Barott, and Richardson, and the work was overseen by F. L. W. Richardson, son of the noted architect Henry Hobson Richardson. The addition was completed in February 1911. ... On May 28, 1926, the Club acquired 150 Commonwealth, which had remained in the Baker Estate until the previous year.  They remodeled the house, combining it with 152 Commonwealth."

Some early members included:

 Katherine Abbott
 Mrs. Rodolphe L. Agassiz
 Mrs. Isabel Weld Perkins Anderson (Mrs. Larz Anderson)
 Mrs. Nelson Bartlett
 Mrs. Henry Forbes Bigelow
 Helen C. Burnham
 Ellen Bullard
 Mrs. Harold J. Coolidge
 Mrs. Philip Dexter
 Marion H. Fenno
 Pauline Fenno
 Mrs. Henry S. Grew
 Mrs. Edward Burlingame Hill
 Mrs. Henry S. Hunnewell
 Mrs. John S. Lawrence
 Mrs. Lester Leland
 Mrs. Robert W. Lovett
 Mrs. E. Preble Motley
 Mrs. Henry Parkman
 Mrs. Richard S. Russell
 Mrs. Henry H. Sprague
 Pauline Revere Thayer
 Ruth Thayer
 Mrs. Bayard Warren
 Mrs. Edwin S. Webster
 Mrs. C. Minot Weld
 Mrs. Frederick S. Whitwell
 Mary E. Williams
 Mrs. Frederic Winthrop
 Eleonora Sears

References

Further reading
 Chilton Club damaged; New Home of Women's Organization on Commonwealth Ave Scene of a $4000 Fire. Boston Daily Globe. Jan 12, 1911. p. 9.
 Chilton Club opened. Boston Daily Globe. Apr 5, 1911. p. 10
 Drinking among women; Rev Herbert S. Johnson Gives Address Which He Said Was Suggested by Action of Chilton Club. Boston Daily Globe. Apr 24, 1911. p. 2.
 License for Chilton Club. Boston Daily Globe. Apr 30, 1911. p. 5
 Tells Mussolini's aims and progress; Count Constantini Speaks at the Chilton Club Italy's leader Has Won Whole Nation's Confidence, He Says. Boston Daily Globe. Jan 16, 1923. p. 13
 Real estate transactions; Chilton Club Purchases Adjoining Parcel. Boston Daily Globe. Jun 15, 1926. p.A19
 Faith Kidder Fuller. Seventy-five years at the Chilton Club : a memoir. Boston, Mass. : Chilton Club, 1985.
 Peggy Hernandez. In about-face, Chilton Club to admit men. Boston Globe. Oct 28, 1988. p. 1.
 Katherine Dempsey, 99, was Chilton Club social director. Boston Globe. Aug 19, 1990. p. 71.
 Elizabeth Fessenden Was Chilton club president. Boston Globe. Jan 4, 1996. p. 27.

External links 
 

1910 establishments in Massachusetts
Culture of Boston
Clubs and societies in Boston
Back Bay, Boston
Women's clubs in the United States
Women in Massachusetts